Aytākh or Ītākh al-Khazarī was a leading commander in the Turkic army of the Abbasid caliph al-Mu'tasim (r. 833-842 C.E.). 

As the nisba in his name suggests, he was a Khazar by origin, and is said to have been a slave working in the kitchen of Sallam al-Abrash al-Khadim—whence his nickname al-Tabbakh, "the cook"—before he was purchased as a ghulām by al-Mu'tasim in 815. He rose to become one of the senior commanders in al-Mu'tasim's "Turkic" guard, and participated in several expeditions such as the Sack of Amorium. 

Under al-Mu'tasim, he served as sahib al-shurta at Samarra, and became commander of the Caliph's personal guard. By the time of the accession of al-Wathiq in 842, he was, along with the Turk Ashinas, the "mainstay of the caliphate". Al-Wathiq named him governor of the Yemen in 843/4. After the death of Ashinas, in 844/5, he  was named governor of Egypt, but he appointed Harthamah ibn al-Nadr al-Jabali there in his stead. Ya'qubi further reports that under al-Wathiq, he was appointed to the governorships of Khurasan, al-Sind, and the sub-provinces of the Tigris River.

When al-Wathiq died unexpectedly in August 847, Itakh was one of the leading officials, along with the vizier Muhammad ibn al-Zayyat, the chief qādī, Ahmad ibn Abi Duwad, his fellow Turkish general Wasif al-Turki, who assembled to determine his successor. Ibn al-Zayyat initially proposed al-Wathiq's son Muhammad (the future al-Muhtadi), but due to his youth he was passed over, and instead the council chose another of al-Mu'tasim's sons, the 26-year-old Ja'far, who became the caliph al-Mutawakkil. Unbeknownst to them, the new Caliph was resolved to destroy the coterie of his father's officials that controlled the state. Al-Mutawakkil's first target was the vizier Ibn al-Zayyat, against whom he harboured a deep grudge over the way he had disrespected him in the past. Thus, on 22 September 847, he sent Itakh to summon Ibn al-Zayyat as if for an audience. Instead, the vizier was brought to Itakh's residence, where he was placed under house arrest. His possessions were confiscated, and he was tortured to death. This was the apogee of Itakh's career: he combined the positions of chamberlain (ḥājib), head of the Caliph's personal guard, intendant of the palace, and head of the barīd, the public post, which doubled as the government's intelligence network. 

In 848, however, he was persuaded to go to the pilgrimage, and laid down his powers, only to be arrested on his return. His possessions were confiscated—reportedly, in his house alone the Caliph's agents found one million gold dinars. He died of thirst in prison in 849.

References

Sources 
 
 
 
 

9th-century Turkic people
9th-century people from the Abbasid Caliphate
849 deaths
Generals of the Abbasid Caliphate
Abbasid people of the Arab–Byzantine wars
Abbasid ghilman
Khazars
Year of birth unknown
Prisoners and detainees of the Abbasid Caliphate
People who died in prison custody